Pansy Yu Fong Wong (born 1955) is a former New Zealand politician.  She was New Zealand's first Asian MP, serving as a member of parliament for the National Party from 1996 to 2011.  She was also New Zealand's first Asian Cabinet Minister, serving as Minister for Ethnic Affairs, Minister of Women's Affairs, Associate Minister for ACC, and Associate Minister of Energy and Resources in the Fifth National Government.

Wong resigned from Parliament in January 2011 after allegations of misusing her Parliamentary travel perks.

Early life
Wong was born in Shanghai and raised in Hong Kong. She attended Queen Elizabeth School, Hong Kong. She emigrated to New Zealand in 1974, and studied commerce at University of Canterbury in Christchurch before embarking on a career in business and accounting. Before entering national politics, she served on the Canterbury Regional Council for seven years until 1996 when she entered parliament as a National List MP. She is married to Malaysian-born businessman Sammy Teck Seng Wong. Wong holds a Master of Commerce (Honours) from the University of Canterbury.   She is also a New Zealand Senior Scholar and Associated Chartered Accountant, awarded with fellowship status. She speaks English, Cantonese, Mandarin Chinese. 

In 1993, Wong was awarded the New Zealand Suffrage Centennial Medal.

Member of Parliament

Wong was elected to Parliament as a list MP in the 1996 election, becoming New Zealand's first ethnically Asian MP.

She unsuccessfully contested the electorate of Auckland Central in the 2005 election. During the 48th New Zealand Parliament she served as National's spokesperson for Commerce and Liaison with Asian New Zealanders and associate spokesperson for Education (International Education), Revenue and Immigration.

She won the new seat of Botany in the 2008 election. The Botany electorate included part of the old Clevedon electorate held by Judith Collins, her National Party colleague. Collins had originally indicated to seek nomination for the seat of Howick (which the Electoral Commission later redrew and renamed to Botany following objections to the boundaries to the neighbouring electorate of Pakuranga), but then stood for the Papakura seat, which also shared common boundaries with Clevedon. Wong's decision was based partly on the fact that 33% of the Botany electorate is Asian.

On 12 November 2010 Wong resigned as a Minister after misusing her parliamentary travel perks for a trip to China on which her husband conducted private business activities, which is specifically prohibited.

Wong resigned as an MP on 17 January 2011, resulting in the 2011 Botany by-election.

On 15 September 2011 Wong was granted the right to retain the title of the Honourable for her lifetime.

References

External links
Parliamentary web page

1955 births
Living people
New Zealand National Party MPs
Women members of the New Zealand House of Representatives
University of Canterbury alumni
Hong Kong emigrants to New Zealand
New Zealand list MPs
New Zealand MPs for Auckland electorates
Members of the New Zealand House of Representatives
21st-century New Zealand politicians
21st-century New Zealand women politicians
Recipients of the New Zealand Suffrage Centennial Medal 1993